The 1913 Svenska Mästerskapet Final was played on 2 November 1913 between the thirteenth-time finalists Örgryte IS and the sixth-time finalists Djurgårdens IF. The match decided the winner of 1913 Svenska Mästerskapet, the football cup to determine the Swedish champions. Örgryte IS won their eleventh title with a 3–2 victory at Walhalla IP in Gothenburg.

Route to the final

Örgryte IS 

Örgryte IS entered in the preliminary round and won 7–2 against GAIS at home on 1 August 1913. On 24 August 1913, Örgryte IS beat Westermalms IF in the quarter-final at home in Gothenburg, 5–0. The semi-final against AIK on 21 September 1913 home in Gothenburg ended in a 1–1 draw. The away-game replay in Stockholm on 28 September 1913, ended in a new draw, again 1–1. On 19 October 1913, Örgryte IS played the second replay against AIK, this time winning the away-game in Stockholm, 5–1.

Örgryte made their thirteenth appearance in a Svenska Mästerskapet final, having won eleven, including three against final opponents Djurgården in 1904, 1906 and 1909, and lost two, including the previous final to Djurgården.

Djurgårdens IF 

Djurgårdens IF entered in the preliminary round on 3 August 1913, where they won, 4–2, against Köpings IS at home in Stockholm. On 24 August 1913, Djurgården won the quarter-final against IFK Uppsala, 2–1 at home. In the semi-final on 21 September 1913, Djurgården beat Johanneshovs IF, 5–1, at home.

Djurgården made their sixth Svenska Mästerskapet final and were reigning champions by winning the previous final against final opponents Örgryte IS, but had also lost to Örgryte on three occasions: in 1904, 1906 and 1909.

Match details

References 

Print

1913
Djurgårdens IF Fotboll matches
Örgryte IS matches
Football in Gothenburg
November 1913 sports events
Sports competitions in Gothenburg
1910s in Gothenburg